This article deals with the rank insignia of the Austro-Hungarian Army, as worn by the Austro-Hungarian Army after the reorganisation in 1867 until 1918.

In the Austrian army rank insignia are traditionally called Paroli
(pl. Parolis) and are worn as gorget patch or collar tap, appliquéd to the gorget fore-part of the uniform coat, uniform jacket and/or battle-dress.

Austro-Hungarian Army 

The rank insignia – so-called Paroli – of the Austro-Hungarian Army (1867–1918) were worn on the fore-part of the sleeves for jackets, but never on shoulder straps of shirts, service jackets, and dress uniforms. They were identically for the Common Army as well as to the Imperial-Royal Landwehr. However, the mountain corps wore additionally an edelweiss since 1907 behind the distinction star(s).

The rank or distinction stars of enlisted personnel and non-commissioned officers (NCO) were made from white celluloid, those of the ranks Feldwebel and Stabsfeldwebel have been made from white silk since 1914. The rank stars of the junior officer ranks normally consisted of relief metal. Pertaining self procured uniforms, embroidered (from metallic fibre) rank stars might have been selected. The embroidered version was mandatory for staff officer ranks from major (OF3) onwards.

For all other k.k. badges of the Austrian-Hungarian mountain corps from OR1-rank Jäger (en: hunter/ private) to the OF5-rank Oberst (en: colonel)

Even on the field shirts, officer rank stars showed the button-colour of the uniform jacket.

However, staff officers had additionally to wear a galloon on the uniform sleeve. If the galloon colour was silver, the colour of the buttons and the stars had to be golden and vice versa. On the galloon there was a serrated ornament. Generals wore always silver stars on golden galloon. From that derives, that the colour of the rank stars and galloons had nothing to do with the rank.

On coats rank insignias had never been worn. Officers of the so-called Kaiserschützen as well as of the "Landwehr infantry regiments number 4 and 27" (also Mountain infantry regiments 4 and 27) wore on their dress uniforms shoulder straps with the imperator´s insignias (not to be mixed up with the particular rank). For any rank description there had to be provided as well an equivalent expression in Hungarian language. Military units, who consisted mainly of Czech, Slovakian, and/ or Polish personal, used unofficially the rank term in their mother language. NCOs were counted to the enlisted personnel, and did not made up a separate rank group.

Cadet 
The Cadet, in its position as aspirant to the professional officer career, ranked as well to the enlisted rank group. The cadet ranks counted to the appropriate nominal rank, however, behind the next higher rank.

The characteristic of the cadet ranks was the so-called distinction-galloon on the sleeve ends. It was similar to the feldwebel-galloon, however, from gold colour instead of emperor-yellow. The particular rank was added as well.

Stabsfeldwebel
To the Feldwebel–uniform the  wore a headgear similar to the officers cap, however, without the characteristic golden officers distinction.

In 1913 the sleeve distinction consisted of a 1.3 cm broad feldwebel-galloon made from imperator-yellow silk. Additionally three white rank celluloid stars were appliquéd. In June 1913 the rank insignia was changed. The galloon was now silver designed, and the rank stars were made from white silk and embroidered.

In 1915 the ranks  (en: officer deputy) were summarised to the new rank group higher/ senior NCOs.

One-year volunteer 
The officer aspirant ( (OA)/ ) of the reserve undertook military training as a One-year volunteer ( (EF)/ ). The distinguishing badge was an imperator-yellow silk square-galloon on the upper part of the cuff. In 1915 the galloon was removed after passing the final examination. It was replaced by the so-called bright “EF-button” to be worn on the collar. The EF-button was fixed behind the nominal rank stars, and was removed on promotion to first officer grade.

Ensign 
The rank „Cadet officer-deputy“ was renamed to Ensign in 1908. The service insignia was a map case, made from black coloured leather, and to be worn on the waist belt. More characteristics were the black officer's cap, however with imperator-yellow side ornament (instead from gold). The white celluloid star was replaced by a silver coloured star. Also in this year, the old term (rank) “” was replaced by the new one Cadet ( / ).

Shako 
In addition to the gorget rank insignias, the so-called distinction, the individual rank was indicated by the yellow distinction-galloon on the parade headgear, called shako a special version of helmet.
 Gefreiter: Was to be identified with a yellow, black-carved 0.5 Austrian inch (~0.5 cm) thick round cord
 Corporal: Wore a 1.5 Austrian inch (~4 cm) broad the yellow distinction-galloon (with zigzag trim ornament)

The distinction galloons and pipings for enlisted ranks and NCOs were made from yellow sheep's wool, for Ensigns since 1908 from yellow silk, and for officers from gold yarn. Pertaining private procured special editions to enlisted ranks and NCOs, silk trims have been allowed as well.

The  (en: corps colour) had to be in correlation to the appropriate military unit, branch, or branch of service.

Enlisted men, NCOs, officer aspirants, and officer-deputies 
(RK means the Rangklasse (Rank classification. As the k.u.k. Army was never a member of NATO, it did not use NATO Rank Codes)

Officers and officials

Members of the military personal status

Enlisted men

NCO ranks

Higher Staff NCO-ranks and officer aspirant (OA) ranks

Officers 

Note
The embroideries of the collars of the ranks major to colonel were always in the same color as the tunic buttons (silver/gold). The rank stars were converse (silver embroidery - golden star(s))
The ranks lieutenant to captain had stars in the same color as the tunic buttons.

Generals 

In the course of uniform reorganisation pertaining the Imperial-Royal Landwehr (de: k.k. Landwehr), the service coat ( or ) of all enlisted personnel was substituted by a tunic in general. The rotary-coloured gorget patch was replaced by a standard gorget patch in grass-green with rank insignias. According to the special function, e.g. as member to a "machine gun unit", the Edelweiss on the gorget patch was additional.

Enlisted personnel insignia of Guards formations 
In the Austrian-Hungarian armed forces there existed five guard units. In two of them served exclusively officer grades. The remaining three of them were called “Enlisted men guards”.

There was no difference between the rank insignias of the officers in comparison to regular troops.

Estate riflemen troops 
k.k. Estate riflemen units and companies were established in the 15th/16th century and did belong to the so-called  (en: home guard). However, k.k. Estate riflemen troops did not wear regular uniforms. After k.k. Estate riflemen troops had to be involved in 1915 to regular military engagement, the Austrian-Hungarian administration was forced to procure these units with regular uniforms. To emphasise the character and status of the Estate riflemen, they did wear slightly different rank insignias. Officer collar patches showed a gold embroidered rosette. Pertaining enlisted personnel and NCOs the rosette was silver embroidered. Because silver and gold embroidery was deficit, the rosettes were finally replaced by celluloid stars, as this was the case to regular troops. The rank insignias were fixed on the collar patches showing at the background the corps colour of the Riflemen infantry (also: Hunter-troops or Riflemen-troops) "Grass-green". Tyrolese collar patches showed the silver metallic "Tyrol eagle" behind the rosette/star. For the Vorarlberg estate riflemen the eagle was replaced by a white metallic shield with the "Vorarlberg coat of arms".

Major was the highest rank of the Estate riflemen troops.

Military officials 
As regards to military officials, there were in force exactly the same rules who applied to military officer ranks. However, military officials wore only four-leaved star rosettes instead of the rank stars (the only exception: officials with explicit star ranks!).

Fiscal officials in line service have been provided always with silver color buttons.

 Further exemptions from the principal rule are described as follows
Military officials with port epée: Staff ranks wore a galloon with applied "cross-band ornament"
Military commissariat official: in the Common Army – golden color buttons; in the home guard silver color buttons 
Military construction engineers: in the Common Army – silver color buttons; in the home guard golden color buttons), 
Military officials without port epée: Staff ranks wore a galloon with "waved cross-band ornament"
Auditors: in the Common Army gold color buttons; in the Home guard silver buttons
Military surgeon officer corps: in the Common Army gold color buttons; in the Home guard silver buttons (with the appropriate variations of collar)

Examples 

See also 
 Adjustierung
 Ranks in the Austro-Hungarian Navy

Notes

Sources 
 Schriften des Heeresgeschichtlichen Museums in Wien Das k.u.k. Heer im Jahre 1895, Edition Leopold Stocker, Graz, 1997 
Rest, Ortner, Illming Des Kaisers Rock im 1. Weltkrieg, Edition Militaria, Vienna, 2002 

Austria-Hungary
Austro-Hungarian Army
Military ranks of Austria
Military units and formations established in 1867
Military of Austria-Hungary